Torne Brook Farm is a historic home and farm complex located at Ramapo in Rockland County, New York.  The complex consists of the mansion built about 1872 in the High Victorian Gothic style, eight contributing and related outbuildings, and one contributing structure.  The main block of the mansion is a 2-story wood-frame dwelling on a cut-stone foundation. It features a mansard roof.  Also on the property are a large -story frame barn, frame carriage house, caretaker's cottage, chicken coops, and a kennel.

It was listed on the National Register of Historic Places in 1988.

References

Houses on the National Register of Historic Places in New York (state)
Gothic Revival architecture in New York (state)
Houses completed in 1872
Houses in Rockland County, New York
National Register of Historic Places in Rockland County, New York